Satellite is the fourth studio album by American Christian nu metal band P.O.D.. The album was released on September 11, 2001 debuting at No. 6 on the Billboard 200 chart with over 133,000 copies sold. It spent five consecutive weeks in the top 10 of that chart.

It went on to sell over three million copies in the U.S., and over seven million worldwide, making it the band's  album. Satellite was placed at No. 137 on the Billboard'''s top 200 albums of the decade . It was the 117th best-selling album of 2001 and the 26th best-selling album of 2002 in the United States.

Album informationSatellite produced four singles with music videos; "Alive", "Youth of the Nation", "Boom", and title track, "Satellite".

"Alive" was nominated for the 2002 Grammy Award for Best Hard Rock Performance. Although not released as a single, "Portrait" was nominated for Best Metal Performance at the 2003 Grammy Awards. "Youth of the Nation" also earned a nomination in 2003 for "Best Hard Rock Performance".

ReceptionRolling Stone (9/27/01, pp. 67–8) – 4 stars out of 5 – "Explodes beyond the confines of what has become a played-out sound... songs on a passion so fierce they're almost exhausting to listen to.... Without resorting to ham-fisted angst, P.O.D. push all the right emotional buttons."Spin (p. 89) – "[They] sang from the heart about school shootings, losing parents, and being truly alive."Q (1/02, p. 106) – 3 out of 5 stars - "...heavy, angry, and very, very loud....many songs have messages of peace and spirituality....their Gen-X angst sounds genuine..."CMJ (10/1/01, p. 16) – "[Its] honest spiritual subject matter coupled with crack-your-skull riffs work like a well-oiled machine."Revolver put Satellite'' on its list called "10 Nu-Metal Albums You Need to Own".

Track listing

A special edition re-release was released a year after the original album release, and featured the bonus tracks version

Personnel

P.O.D.
 P.O.D. – art direction
 Sonny Sandoval – lead vocals
 Marcos Curiel – guitar, backing vocals
 Traa Daniels – bass, backing vocals
 Wuv Bernardo – drums, backing vocals

Ridiculous
 Eek-A-Mouse – additional vocals
 Steve Russell – guitar tech, pre-production assistance

Anything Right
 Christian Lindskog – additional vocals 
 Joel Derouin – violin 
 Larry Corbett – cello 
 Suzy Katayama – string arrangement and conducting

Youth of the Nation
 D.J. Harper, Jonnie Hall, Colin Sasaki, Nils Montan, Laurie Schillinger, Meagan Moore, Ayanna Williams, Healey Moore – children's choir 
 Bobbi Page – contractor

Miscellaneous
 H.R. – vocals on "Without Jah, Nothin'"
 Howard Benson – producer, keyboards and loops
 Chris Lord-Alge – mixing at Image Recording Studios, Los Angeles, California
 Randy Staub – engineering
 Ted Jensen – mastering at Sterling Sound, Chelsea, New York
 Eric Miller – assistant recording engineer
 Chris "Sleepy J" Vaughan-Jones

Assistant Engineers / Pro-Tools Editors
 Matt Silva and Steve Kaplan – assistant mix engineers
 Duane Barron – additional assistant engineer
 Bobby Brooks – additional assistant engineering, Pro-Tools editing
 Jim Foster – Pro-Tools Editing

Technicians
 Andres Torres – guitar tech
 Gary Girsh – drum tech

Management
 Martie Kolbl – project coordination
 Craig Rosen – project administration

Artwork
 Larry Freemantle – art direction
 Jill Greenberg – photography

Charts

Weekly charts

Year-end charts

Decade-end charts

Certifications

Awards

MTV Video Music Awards 2002
 Best Video of the Year for "Alive" (nominated)
 Best Group Video for "Alive" (nominated)
 Best Rock Video for "Youth of the Nation" (nominated)
 Best Direction for "Alive" (nominated)
 Best Special Effects for "Alive" (nominated)
 Viewer's Choice for "Alive" (nominated)

2002 Grammy Awards
 Best Hard Rock Performance for "Alive" (nomination)

2003 Grammy Awards
 Best Metal Performance for "Portrait" (nomination)
 Best Hard Rock Performance for "Youth of the Nation" (nomination)

References

P.O.D. albums
2001 albums
Rap rock albums by American artists
Hard rock albums by American artists
Atlantic Records albums
Albums produced by Howard Benson